Odo II (died 1032) was the only son of Thietmar, Margrave of the Saxon Ostmark. He succeeded his father in January 1030. All that is known of him is that he left no issue, dying most likely prior to achieving majority. He was succeeded by his brother-in-law, Dedo. The Ostmark, however, was so diminished that nothing remained of it for Dedo save Lower Lusatia.

Notes

References
Jackman, Donald. Criticism and Critique: Sidelights on the Konradiner. Oxford: Unit For Prosopographical Research, 1997.
Medieval Lands Project: Nobility of Meissen.

External links
 

Margraves of the Saxon Ostmark
1032 deaths
Year of birth unknown